Eulonia is an unincorporated community and census-designated place (CDP) in McIntosh County in the U.S. state of Georgia. Part of the Brunswick, Georgia Metropolitan Statistical Area, it is in the Low Country between Savannah and Brunswick near Interstate 95.

It was first listed as a CDP in the 2020 census with a population of 351.

Geography
Eulonia is in central McIntosh, with the CDP centered around the intersection of U.S. Route 17 and Georgia State Route 99. US 17 leads south  to Darien, the county seat, and north  to Riceboro. SR 99 leads east  to Crescent and west  to Interstate 95 at Exit 58. I-95, which forms the western edge of the Eulonia CDP, leads north  to Savannah and south  to Brunswick.

The tidal Sapelo River forms the northern edge of the CDP and runs out to the Atlantic Ocean  to the east at Sapelo Sound.

Culture
Many of Eulonia's residents are members of the Gullah ethnic group of African Americans, some of whom also live on nearby Sapelo Island. The McIntosh County Shouters, a Gullah traditional music group, perform regularly at Eulonia's Mt. Calvary Baptist Church.

Demographics

2020 census

Note: the US Census treats Hispanic/Latino as an ethnic category. This table excludes Latinos from the racial categories and assigns them to a separate category. Hispanics/Latinos can be of any race.

References

Census-designated places in McIntosh County, Georgia
Unincorporated communities in McIntosh County, Georgia
Brunswick metropolitan area
Gullah country
Gullah culture
Populated riverside places in the United States